Claude Bosi (born 1972) is a French chef. 

Claude's first Head Chef position was at Overton Grange in 1999.

He opened his first UK restaurant Hibiscus in the market town of Ludlow, Shropshire, in 2000 which was awarded two Michelin Stars in 2004. In 2007, Claude Bosi decided to relocate the restaurant to London, where he went on to reclaim the two Michelin Stars in 2009.

Claude closed Hibiscus in October 2016.

January 2017 saw him take over the operations of the eponymous within the Michelin building, prominently located on Fulham Road in London's Chelsea. Officially opening Claude Bosi at Bibendum Restaurant in late March, of the same year, Claude has held two Michelin Stars since October 2017. Claude Bosi is the only chef in history to have Michelin stars awarded to the restaurant in the original UK Michelin HQ (at Michelin House).

Career
After graduating from catering Michelin Bosi served his apprenticeship at restaurant Léon de Lyon. 

He moved on to work at a variety of Michelin-starred restaurants in France including La Pyramide Fernand Point, Restaurant Chiberta, L'Arpège and Restaurant Alain Ducasse. He was working at L'Arpège when the restaurant won its third Michelin star. He moved to Ludlow, Shropshire, to become sous chef of Overton Grange in 1997. He became head chef, and in 1999, he won his first Michelin star whilst there.

Bosi opened his own restaurant, Hibiscus, also in Ludlow, in 2000. Within a year he had won a Michelin star, and in 2004 he was awarded a second. Hibiscus was sold in March 2007, with Bosi relocating the restaurant to London with the help of three investors. The 45-seat restaurant launch in October 2007 at 29 Maddox Street in Mayfair. In late 2013, Claude bought out his investors, redesigned the interior to give it a more relaxed, yet pepersonalizedeel, and added the Chef's table and development kitchen. Hibiscus has received numerous accolades for its modern French cuisine: two Michelin Stars since 2003, a 9/10 rating and number 5 in the UK in the Waitrose Good Food Guide 2016, and five rosettes in the AA Restaurant Guide 2016. Hibiscus was also recognised as a member of the Relais & Château and Les Grandes Tables du Monde Qualité & Tradition guides. Claude closed the doors of Hibiscus after the last dinner service on Saturday 1 October 2016.

With a major refurbishment starting on 3 January 2017, the project of renovating the first floor restaurant of Bibendum took ten weeks. Claude Bosi at Bibendum launched in late March 2017. In October, the same year, it was awarded two Michelin Stars, a phenomenal achievement. 

In 2010, Bosi took over the Wimbledon-based pub The Fox and Grape alongside his brother Cedrick. The duo reopened it as a gastropub whilst retaining the original name. The brothers had previously run a pub together in Yarpole, Herefordshire, until 2010.
In 2016, Bosi took over The Swan Inn between Esher and Claygate. After extensive refurbishment the Inn reopened as a gastropub with luxurious rooms in May 2016.
In July 2018, Bosi won the coveted Chef Award at The Caterer's The Catey Awards.
He appeared on BBC One's Saturday Kitchen in March 2012. Later in the same year Bosi was one of a number of chefs to work at "The Cube", a pop up restaurant sat on top of London's South Bank Centre.

In 2018, Claude partnered with Rémy Martin to open La Maison Rémy Martin, a stunning Cognac cocktail and food pairing bar

Controversy
In November 2012 restaurant blogger James Isherwood awarded Bosi's restaurant three out of five stars, reporting that the crab was extremely overcooked.  Bosi retorted on Twitter with "You're a co** and this is personal"

Personal life
In January 2020, Bosi revealed that he had been refused permission to stay permanently in the UK after Brexit despite having lived in the country for 23 years

Claude Bosi lives in Clapham with his wife Lucy Bosi, son Freddie (2014) and daughter Mabel (2020). He has another daughter, Paige (2003), from his first marriage.

References

External links
 Homepage restaurant Hibiscus

Living people
Chefs from Lyon
1972 births
French expatriates in the United Kingdom
British television chefs
Head chefs of Michelin starred restaurants